Lombardy 3 is one of the 29 constituencies represented in the Chamber of Deputies, the lower house of the Italian parliament. The constituency originally elected 23 deputies, while since 2022, following the constitutional referendum which reduced the number of seats in parliament, it elects 14 deputies. Its boundaries correspond to those of the provinces of Bergamo and Brescia, within the Lombardy region. The electoral system uses a parallel voting system, which act as a mixed system, with 37% of seats allocated using a first-past-the-post electoral system and 61% using a proportional method, with one round of voting. 

The constituency was established by the Rosato law on 3 November 2017.

Members of the Parliament

Since 2022

Single-member districts

Multi-member districts

Notes

2018–2022

Single-member districts

Multi-member districts

Notes

Elections

2018

Overall

Result by district

2022

Overall

Result by district

References

Chamber of Deputies constituencies in Italy
2017 establishments in Italy
Constituencies established in 2017
Politics of Italy
Politics of Lombardy